Halli Rambhe Belli Bombe is a 1991 Indian Kannada-language romance film directed by M. S. Rajashekar, written by Panju Arunachalam based on his own 1988 Tamil film Manamagale Vaa and produced by M. P. Shankar. The film stars Malashri and Chi. Guru Dutt. The film had cinematography by V. K. Kannan and the dialogues and lyrics are written by Chi. Udaya Shankar who also enacted in a supporting role.

The film's music was composed by Upendra Kumar and the audio was launched on the Sangeetha label.

Cast 

Malashri 
Chi. Guru Dutt
Chi. Udaya Shankar
M. P. Shankar
Girija Lokesh
Ravikiran
Shivaram
Umashree
Balakrishna
M. S. Rajashekar
Sudheer
Sihi Kahi Chandru
Honnavalli Krishna
Agro Chikkanna
Kaminidharan
Rekha Das

Soundtrack 
The music of the film was composed by Upendra Kumar with lyrics by Chi. Udaya Shankar.

References 

1991 films
1990s Kannada-language films
Indian romantic comedy-drama films
Films scored by Upendra Kumar
Kannada remakes of Tamil films
Films directed by M. S. Rajashekar